Hugh Thomas Miller (March 21, 1867 – May 26, 1947) was a politician from the U.S. state of Indiana. Between 1905 and 1909, he served as Lieutenant Governor of Indiana.

Life
Hugh Miller was born in Johnson County in Indiana. In 1888, he graduated from Butler University. In the following years, until 1892, he taught French at this University. Afterwards, he studied history in Paris and Berlin. Between 1893 and 1899, he was a history professor at the Butler University and in 1899, he accepted the position of an assistant cashier at the Irwin's Bank in Columbus, Indiana.
 
Miller joined the Republican Party and in 1902, he was elected to the Indiana House of Representatives. Two years later, he ran successfully for the office of the Lieutenant Governor of Indiana. He served in this position between 9 January 1905 and 11 January 1909, when his term ended. In this function, he was the deputy of Governor Frank Hanly and he presided over the Indiana Senate. In 1914, he was a candidate for U.S. Senator.

After his term as Lieutenant Governor, Hugh Miller started a business career. In 1910, he accepted the position of a director and vice-president of the Union Trust Company. He also was a director of the Union Starch and Refining Company, and the Cummins Engine Company. He died on 26 May 1947 in Columbus, Indiana.

References

External links

 The Political Graveyard
 Miller at the Lilly Library Manuscript Collections

1867 births
1947 deaths
Republican Party members of the Indiana House of Representatives
Lieutenant Governors of Indiana
People from Johnson County, Indiana